Persatuan Sepakbola Pemuda Jaya (simply known as PS Pemuda Jaya) is an Indonesian football club based in East Jakarta, Jakarta. They currently competes in Liga 3. The establishment of this club was originally only a youth organization during the period of filling the independence of Indonesia

References

External links

East Jakarta
Sport in Jakarta
Football clubs in Indonesia
Football clubs in Jakarta
Association football clubs established in 1959
1959 establishments in Indonesia